Homi Bhabha may refer to:

Homi J. Bhabha (1909–1966), Indian nuclear physicist
Homi K. Bhabha (born 1949), Indian-American postcolonial theorist and professor of English

See also
 Bhabha (disambiguation)
 Bhabha (surname)